Priese Prince Lamont "Printz" Board (born September 11, 1982) is an American record producer, songwriter, and singer best known for his work with Black Eyed Peas and being a member of the production group Bucky Johnson. In addition, Board has worked with DJ Mustard, CeeLo Green, Mark Ronson, Fergie, and John Legend, among others.

Early life
Printz is from Columbus, Ohio but moved to Los Angeles at age 10. As a trumpeter, he explored the parameters of jazz and music that instigated his journey from his hometown, where music legends like Jimi Hendrix, Bob Marley, The Eagles and P-Funk stoked his imagination. Relocating to San Diego State College, he had to decide between a career in music or soccer. Staying in music, he added classical greats to his eclectic mix of musical influences.

Career
After migrating to Los Angeles, he met a band that needed a keyboard player. Over time this band evolved into the group Black Eyed Peas. Printz has been an essential part of this hit-making machine. He was the co-writer of songs like "Where is the Love", "Don’t Phunk with My Heart", and "Meet Me Halfway". Besides his co-writing for the Black Eyed Peas, he is the musical director commanding the band's live stadium shows. In 2001, Board founded the production company Beets & Produce, Inc., publishing through Atlas Music Publishing. In 2007 Board and his fellow music group Bucky Jonson released the album The Band Behind The Front on the BBE label.

The inspiration to start his solo career came with the Black Eyed Peas taking a break in 2011. As the artists each took their own separate paths, Printz took the one that he had been thinking of taking for a while. In the fall of 2013, Printz stepped forward to launch his solo project, kicking things off with packed LA and NYC secret shows at the Roxy and S.O.B.’s respectively. He brought on a surprise guest – Natasha Bedingfield - for a special duet of "Mountains". In the span of several months, Printz released an EP Pre-Games, singles "#1" (debut at No.11 in the UK Urban Charts) and Hey You (which was prominently placed in a national Pizza Hut commercial) performed at SXSW, opened for CeeLo Green and Lionel Richie, and received features/premieres on MTV Buzzworthy, USA Today, MetroLyrics, and Singersroom. In the same year Printz Board was one of the top finalists in Macy’s iHeart Radio Rising Star contest.

Personal life
Board has worked with the Lennon Bus since the late 1990s. He has three children.

The song ["Mountains"] was inspired by the close bond he shares with his mother. "My mom was quite young when she had me so we grew up sort of like brother and sister, under the same roof with my grandparents," he says. "When she finally got out of school, it was a struggle, but she was always of the mind-set like, 'You just keep trucking, you keep moving forward,' and she always instilled that in me."

Discography
As a songwriter, producer, and musician, he has collaborated with Justin Timberlake, Michael Jackson, Busta Rhymes, Chris Brown, Dr. Dre, Fergie, Selena Gomez, Laura Pausini and Katy Perry. Printz Board wrote and/or produced six songs on the deluxe edition of Black Eyed Peas Grammy nominated album "The E.N.D." (2009) including, "Missing You" and "Out Of My Head" (co-producer and writer along with frontman will.i.am). He is writer of "Rockin' to the Beat," "One Tribe," "Where Ya Wanna Go" and "Don't Phunk Around." In addition to Album of the Year, "The E.N.D." was also nominated for The Best Pop Vocal Album at the 52nd Annual Grammy Awards.

Board has worked on the albums The Dutchess (2006) by Fergie, Natasha Bedingfield, 100 Miles from Memphis (2010) by Sheryl Crow, Bashtown (2011) by Baby Bash, and Candy Dulfer’s album titled Crazy (2011), out of the twelve tracks on this album Board produced a total of 7. Board spent six months in New Zealand to work for Kim Dotcom and his Album Good Times which was published 2013 and Keyshia Cole's single "She" from the album Point of No Return (2014) produced by DJ Mustard. Printz produced the album Six60 (Deluxe) from New Zealand’s Six60 (2015), he produced and songwrote for the albums earlier released single "Special" that in 2014 went #1 in New Zealand in its first week.

In 2013, Board launched his solo career releasing the debut single "#1" and "Hey You" through Atlas Music Publishing. In 2014, Board released the single "Mountains", the latest track off his Pre-Games EP.

In 2017, Printz was featured on Greg Gould's EP 'Don't Let Go' on a live studio version of Estelle's American Boy. The EP debuted at #16 on the Australian iTunes Charts.

Awards and nominations
Printz Board has won several Grammy awards and nominations for his work with the Black Eyed Peas.

The E.N.D. won Best Pop Vocal Album in 2010, and "My Humps" won Best Pop Performance by a Duo or Group in 2007.

"Don't Phunk with my Heart" was nominated for Best Rap Song, but instead won Best Rap/Song Collaboration.

"Where Is the Love?" was nominated twice; Record of the Year and Best Rap/Song Collaboration.

Board also won two BMI Songwriter Awards for "Where Is the Love?" and "Meet Me Halfway".

References

External links
 
 
 
 Printz Board Interview: ‘Pre-Games’ EP, Working With Black Eyed Peas + More, Mandi Salerno for PopCrush, July 25, 2014

1982 births
Living people
Record producers from Ohio
Songwriters from Ohio
Musicians from Columbus, Ohio
Black Eyed Peas